Chris Jarman is a British stage and television actor. He is the voice-over for E4's Tattoo Fixers. He is also known for providing the voice of The Mechanic in Thunderbirds Are Go. Jarman played Doctor Dillamond, and understudied the role of the Wizard of Oz, in the London production of the musical Wicked from 2018 to July 20, 2019.

Work

References

British male stage actors
Living people
British male film actors
Year of birth missing (living people)
English people of Barbadian descent
Place of birth missing (living people)